Manfred Thiesmann is a former German Olympic swimming coach of the 1970s, 1980s, 1990s and 2000s who was the head coach of the German swimming team at the 2000 Summer Olympics.

References 

Year of birth missing (living people)
Living people
Swimming coaches